Shamsabad  is a village in Faisalabad, neighboring areas are Bhaiwala and Nishatabad. Shamsabad is adjacent with Nishatabad Flyover on Jhumra Road.

References

Villages in Faisalabad District